Amanda Redington (born January 1962) is a British presenter and actress. She has been a presenter for cable and satellite TV channels such as Music Box and Sky Channel, during the mid and late 1980s, on GMTV in 1993 and on The Warehouse on Anglia TV.

Redington was a member of the music trio called K-Ram (their only hit was Menage à trois in 1984) and she took part in The Rap Pack.

She married Dutch singer Frank Boeijen in 1990, they divorced in 1994.

She has acted on the stage in Wife Begins at 40, playing Linda Harper; in Bedside Manners as Sally; in Snow White as the Wicked Queen; and in Jack and the Beanstalk as the fairy. Redington played the title role in Peter Pan at the Lewisham Theatre; she also played Jack in Jack and the Beanstalk; and she played Sandy in Grease at the Palace Theatre in Manchester.

Her film roles include Miss February in Sahara Sandwich (1991); Dorothy Rosenbaum in Flodders in America (1992); and Mandy in The Best Thing in Life (1993).

Amanda Redington has also appeared in numerous TV commercials, including those for Persil, M&M's, Coca-Cola, Vauxhall Cavalier, Daily Mail, Lunn Poly, Hamlet Cigars, Maltesers, Traveler's cheques, Vodafone, and NatWest.

References

External links
Amanda Redington at BFI Film & TV Database

 Amanda Redington at Richard Kort Associates (Theatrical Agency Theatre Agents Entertainment Management)

1962 births
British television presenters
GMTV presenters and reporters
British film actresses
British stage actresses
Living people
Date of birth missing (living people)
Place of birth missing (living people)
British women television presenters